Dely Ibrahim is a suburb of the city of Algiers in northern Algeria. Here is located Serbian Military cemetery, created between 1916 and 1919. At the time in several coastal towns and villages in Algeria were more French military hospitals where the wounded and exhausted Serbian soldiers were treated. Those soldiers were from the island of Corfu and Vido transported for further treatment in the Allied military hospital in North Africa.

Notable people

References 

Suburbs of Algiers
Communes of Algiers Province
Algiers Province